Bosnia and Herzegovina sent a delegation to compete at the 2010 Winter Paralympics, in Vancouver. It fielded a single athlete, in alpine skiing.

Although Bosnia and Herzegovina had been taking part in the Summer Paralympics since 1996, this was the country's first participation in the Winter Paralympic Games.

Alpine skiing 

The following athlete was Bosnia and Herzegovina's sole representative in alpine skiing:

See also
Bosnia and Herzegovina at the 2010 Winter Olympics
Bosnia and Herzegovina at the Paralympics

References

External links
Vancouver 2010 Paralympic Games official website
International Paralympic Committee official website

Nations at the 2010 Winter Paralympics
2010
Paralympics